Novi Mikanovci is a village in Croatia. It is connected by the D46 highway.

Name
The name of the village in Croatian is plural.

Populated places in Vukovar-Syrmia County
Populated places in Syrmia